The following are the telephone codes in Djibouti.

Calling formats
 21 XX XX XX - fixed line Djibouti City, Balbala
 27 XX XX XX - fixed line other regions
 77 (1, 2, 3, 4, 5, 6, 7 or 8)X XX XX - Djibouti Telecom mobile phones
 +253 - country code for calling to Djibouti
 00 + country code + international number - calling internationally from Djibouti

The NSN length is eight digits. Digits 1 & 2 define service type, digits 3 & 4 are fixed line locality.

List of allocations in Djibouti
A new number plan took effect 1 November 2010.

References

External links
ITU Update 3.1.2012

Djibouti
Telecommunications in Djibouti
Telephone numbers